Andrew Stark may refer to:

 Andrew Stark (diplomat) (1916–2006), British diplomat
 Andrew Stark (photographer), Australian candid and urban street photographer